A Compilation may refer to:

A Compilation (Natalie MacMaster album)
Atlantic Jaxx Recordings: A Compilation